Mandai Crematorium and Columbarium is a crematorium and columbarium complex located at Mandai Road in Mandai, Singapore. The complex is operated by the Government of Singapore under the National Environment Agency. It is one of two government crematoria in Singapore, the other being the Choa Chu Kang Columbarium.

Mandai Crematorium and Columbarium is located not far from Yishun New Town.

This complex is one of the final resting places for many Singaporeans because of the new technology and limited spaces to host cemeteries for the dead.

History
With Mount Vernon Crematorium, the only government crematorium reaching its maximum capacity in the late 1970s, a need for a second crematorium arose. The Government chose a plot of land at Mandai to build Singapore's second crematorium. Completed in 1982, it consists of 4 big cremators and 4 small cremators, and 1200 niches. Shortly after its opening, it was designated to cremate exhumed remains from closed down cemeteries in Singapore.

In 2000, the government decided that all cremation services would be consolidated at Mandai. So, a new extension was built just south of the original complex. Completed in mid 2004, this complex comprises four service halls, four viewing halls, 12 cremators and one waiting hall, replacing the Mount Vernon Crematorium, which closed down on the same day the new complex opened. The columbarium was also expanded to include remains displaced from the closure of Mount Vernon Crematorium as well.

To meet the growing demand of the island's population, the Government decided to expand the crematorium further. Slated to be completed in 3Q 2019, it will have six service halls, six viewing halls, three waiting halls and 18 cremators.

Gallery

See also
Other non-government crematoria and columbarium in Singapore include:
 Kong Meng San Phor Kark See Monastery
 Kranji State Cemetery – traditional burial options for notable persons in Singapore
 Kwong Wai Siew Peck San Theng – Chinese clan-based non-government columbarium

References

External links
 

Crematoria in Singapore
Death in Singapore
Columbaria in Singapore